Mubarak Pur Dabas is a village in North West district in the Indian state of Delhi. It is a Jat village in the north-west region of Delhi, dominated by the Dabas gotra.

Demographics
As per 2011 India Census, Mubarak Pur Dabas census town has population of 12,043 out of which 6,441 are males while 5,602 are females. Literacy rate of the village is 81.64% which is lower than state average of 86.21%. In Mubarak Pur Dabas, Male literacy is around 88.73% while female literacy rate is 73.48%. Kanjhawala, Ghevra, Nangloi are the neighbouring villages of Mubarak Pur Dabas. 
The most common language of Mubarak Pur Dabas is Haryanvi, along with Hindi.

References

Cities and towns in North West Delhi district